The  is a small Neoclassical-style church in the  (district) of Dorsoduro in Venice. It is dedicated to the Apostle Saint Barnabas.

History
A church at the site was built in the ninth century, but destroyed by fire in 1105. Rebuilt in 1350, it was reconstructed in its present form in 1776 under the patronage of Marcantonio Grimani using designs of Lorenzo Boschetti. The 11th-century campanile, detached from the main body of the church, has a pine-cone shaped spire from the 1300s. The church is now deconsecrated and used for exhibitions.

References

Roman Catholic churches completed in 1776
Roman Catholic churches in Venice
18th-century Roman Catholic church buildings in Italy